The following lists events that happened in 2015 in the Republic of Croatia.

Incumbents 
 President – Ivo Josipović (until 19 February), Kolinda Grabar-Kitarović (starting 19 February)
 Prime Minister – Zoran Milanović

Events

 January 11 - Former diplomat and foreign minister Kolinda Grabar-Kitarović from the Croatian Democratic Union narrowly defeats incumbent president Ivo Josipović and becomes the first female president of Croatia on February 18, 2015.
September - Croatia co-hosts Eurobasket 2015 with Germany, Latvia and France.
 November 8 - Parliamentary election is held.

Deaths
 March 4 – Dušan Bilandžić, historian and politician
 March 7 – Tomislav Radić, film director
 May 6 – Janko Vranyczany-Dobrinović, politician and diplomat
 August 17 – Arsen Dedić, singer-songwriter, composer and poet
 October 1 – Božo Bakota, footballer
 October 23 – Krunoslav Hulak, chess master
 November 20 – Vlatko Dulić, actor

See also
2015 in Croatian television

References

 
Years of the 21st century in Croatia
Croatia
Croatia
2010s in Croatia